The Compact Arkham Unveiled is a 1995 role-playing game supplement for Call of Cthulhu published by Chaosium.

Contents
The Compact Arkham Unveiled is an update of the prior Arkham Unveiled without the adventure scenarios, and provides a gazetteer to the town of Arkham as it was in the 1920s.

Reception
Steve Faragher reviewed The Compact Arkham Unveiled for Arcane magazine, rating it a 9 out of 10 overall. Faragher comments that "If you're just starting up a campaign and you want to centre it around Arkham or have Arkham feature very prominently then this book will reward you hugely for any effort you put into it."

References

Call of Cthulhu (role-playing game) supplements
Role-playing game supplements introduced in 1995